Cultural Diversity and Ethnic Minority Psychology is the quarterly academic journal of the American Psychological Association Division 45: Society for the Psychological Study of Culture, Ethnicity, and Race.  It covers the psychological science of culture, ethnicity, and race. The first issue of the journal appeared in 1995. The editor is Richard M. Lee (University of Minnesota).

Abstracting and indexing
The journal is abstracted and indexed by MEDLINE/PubMed, EMBASE, PsycINFO, Sociological Abstracts, and the Social Sciences Citation Index. According to the Journal Citation Reports, the journal has a 2021 impact factor of 4.035.

See also
List of psychology journals

References

External links

Cultural psychology journals
American Psychological Association academic journals
English-language journals
Publications established in 1995
Quarterly journals